Boone Grove High School is a public high school in Valparaiso, Indiana, United States. It is part of the Porter Township School Corporation.

Boone Grove High School includes grades 9–12.  In 1913, the first 4-year commissioned high school was built in Boone Grove.

Demographics
The demographic breakdown of the 503 students enrolled in the 2016–2017 was:
Male – 51.1%
Female – 48.9%
Asian – 0.4%
Black – 2.4%
Hispanic – 12.9%
White – 82.9%
Multiracial – 1.4%

27.8% of the students were eligible for free or reduced-cost lunch.

Athletics
The school's colors are royal blue and white. The mascot is the wolf. Athletic teams participate in the Porter County Conference (PCC). The following sports programs are offered at Boone Grove:

Girls' sports
 Soccer
 Volleyball
 Golf
 Gymnastics
 Basketball
 Softball
 Cross Country
 Cheerleading
 Tennis

Boys' sports
 Football
 Wrestling
 Baseball
 Basketball
 Track
 Cross country
 Golf
 Soccer
 Volleyball

See also
 List of high schools in Indiana

References

External links
 

Public high schools in Indiana
Schools in Porter County, Indiana
Educational institutions established in 1913
1913 establishments in Indiana
Valparaiso, Indiana